Justin Connor Foscue (born March 2, 1999) is an American professional baseball second baseman in the Texas Rangers organization. He was selected 14th overall by the Rangers in the 2020 Major League Baseball draft.

Amateur career
Foscue attended Virgil I. Grissom High School in Huntsville, Alabama, where he played baseball. In 2017, his senior year, he hit .318 with six home runs, earning All-State honors. Undrafted in the 2017 Major League Baseball draft, he fulfilled his commitment to play college baseball at Mississippi State University.

In 2018, Foscue's freshman season at Mississippi State, he appeared in 58 games, batting .241 with three home runs and twenty RBIs. As a sophomore in 2019, he moved from third base to second base and slashed .331/.395/.564 with 14 home runs, sixty RBIs, and 22 doubles over 67 starts. He earned All-SEC First-Team honors. That summer, he played for the United States collegiate national team. In 2020, Foscue's junior year, he hit .302 with two home runs and 16 RBIs over 16 games before the college baseball season was cut short due to the COVID-19 pandemic.

Professional career
Foscue was selected 14th overall by the Texas Rangers in the 2020 Major League Baseball draft. He signed with the Rangers on June 19 for a $3.25 million bonus. He did not play in 2020 due to the cancellation of the Minor League Baseball season because of the COVID-19 pandemic. 

To begin the 2021 season, Foscue was assigned to the Hickory Crawdads of the High-A East. He missed the whole month of June and the beginning of July after suffering a rib injury. He received a cortisone injection and rehabbed with the Arizona Complex League Rangers before returning to Hickory on July 10. From July 9 (his last rehab appearance) to July 23 (with Hickory), Foscue homered in eight consecutive games, tying the Major League Baseball record. In early August, he was promoted to the Frisco RoughRiders of the Double-A Central. Over 62 games for the 2021 season, Foscue slashed .275/.371/.590 with 17 home runs and 51 RBIs. He played in the Arizona Fall League for the Surprise Saguaros after the season, hitting .257/.416/.529/.944 with five home runs and 14 RBIs. He opened the 2022 season with Frisco on the injured list with a back injury. Over 101 games with Frisco, he slashed .288/.367/.483 with 15 home runs, 81 RBIs, and 31 doubles.

References

External links

Mississippi State Bulldogs bio

1999 births
Living people
Sportspeople from Huntsville, Alabama
Baseball players from Alabama
Baseball second basemen
Mississippi State Bulldogs baseball players
Arizona Complex League Rangers players
Hickory Crawdads players
Frisco RoughRiders players
Surprise Saguaros players
United States national baseball team players